Kolhapur South Assembly constituency is one of the 274 Vidhan Sabha (Assembly) constituencies of Maharashtra state in Western India.

Members of Legislative Assembly

Election results

2019 results 

|}

References

Assembly constituencies of Kolhapur district
Kolhapur
Assembly constituencies of Maharashtra